Carleton North was a provincial electoral district for the Legislative Assembly of New Brunswick, Canada.

This district contained the northern third of Carleton County, including the municipalities of Bath, Bristol, Centreville and Florenceville.

From 1974 to 1987 the seat was represented by Progressive Conservative Charles Gallagher who served as a senior cabinet minister until 1985 before becoming speaker of the legislature.

In 1987, Liberal Fred Harvey was elected in a landslide which saw the Liberals win every seat in the legislature.  Harvey was narrowly re-elected in 1991 but was expelled from the legislature in 1993 for violations of the Elections Act.

Dale Graham, a Progressive Conservative, was elected in a 1993 by-election.  Graham was re-elected 5 times in the successor district of Carleton and serve as deputy premier and speaker.

Members of the Legislative Assembly

Election results

External links
Website of the Legislative Assembly of New Brunswick

References

Former provincial electoral districts of New Brunswick